Mari Raamot (birth name Mari Tamm; August 6, 1872 in Kiltsi, Tarvastu Parish (now Viljandi Parish), Kreis Fellin – March 12, 1966 in New York City) was an Estonian socialist, homemaker, and founder of the Estonian women's national defense movement.

She was born in Kiltsi, Tarvastu Parish (now Viljandi Parish), Kreis Fellin as the daughter of a farmer. During her teenage years she studied home economics at the Lilli Suburg Girls' School in Viljandi, then at Königsberg, and later at Kiel and Leipzig, and worked as a home teacher in St. Petersburg.

During the first German occupation in 1918, she was imprisoned. Later, she was a member of the Estonian Red Cross General Government and the head of the fundraising department, one of the founders and chairman of the Young Women Christian Association, the founders and chairwoman of the Women's Home Guard 1927–1936, and one of the founders of the Housewives Movement.

References 

1966 deaths
1872 births
People from Viljandi Parish
People from Kreis Fellin
Estonian activists
Estonian women activists
Estonian World War II refugees
Estonian emigrants to the United States